This is the list of presidents of Brittany since 1974. Regional legislatures are directly elected since 1986

Politics of Brittany
Lists of French politicians